Elijah William Bacon (1836 – May 6, 1864) was an American soldier who received the Medal of Honor for valor during the American Civil War.

Biography
Bacon joined the 14th Connecticut Infantry in July 1862. During Pickett's Charge on 3 July 1863, Bacon captured the battleflag of the 16th North Carolina Infantry. He was killed on 6 May 1864 at the Battle of the Wilderness, and received the Medal of Honor posthumously on 1 December 1864.

Medal of Honor citation
Citation:

Capture of flag of 16th North Carolina regiment.

See also

List of Medal of Honor recipients for the Battle of Gettysburg
List of American Civil War Medal of Honor recipients: A–F

References

External links

Military Times

1836 births
1864 deaths
Union Army soldiers
United States Army Medal of Honor recipients
People of Connecticut in the American Civil War
Union military personnel killed in the American Civil War
American Civil War recipients of the Medal of Honor
Military personnel from Connecticut
People from Burlington, Connecticut